Sam Whiteman may refer to:

 Sam Whiteman (American football) (1901–?), American football player for the Chicago Bulls
 Sam Whiteman (Australian cricketer) (born 1992), Australian cricketer for Western Australia
 Sam Whiteman (New Zealand cricketer) (born 1982), New Zealand cricketer for Auckland